American singer Brenda Lee has issued 29 studio albums, 26 compilation albums (from major labels), and 4 video albums since 1959. Lee has sold over 100 million records worldwide, making her one of the most successful American pop singers of the 20th century. In the Sixties, she earned 46 Hot 100 singles in the United States, more than any female recording artist. Billboard ranked her the "Top Female Artist of the Decade (60s)" and 15th Greatest Hot 100 Female Artist of all time.

Lee has charted 48 songs on the US Hot 100 singles chart including two number-one hits and 29 top 40 hits. Her first number-one hit on Billboard Hot 100 is the classic "I'm Sorry", which topped the chart for three weeks and has sold over 15 million copies worldwide. "Rockin' Around the Christmas Tree" became a Christmas standard and peaked at number two on the Billboard Hot 100 in 2020, 62 years after the song was first released. As of 2008, "Rockin' Around the Christmas Tree" has sold more than 25 million copies worldwide, with the fourth most digital downloads sold of any Christmas single in history.

Studio albums

1950s and 1960s

1970s and 1980s

1990s and 2000s

Collaborations

Holiday albums

Compilation albums

Singles

1950s

1960s

1970s

1980s and 1990s

Other singles

Christmas singles

Holiday 100 chart entries
Since many radio stations in the US adopt a format change to Christmas music each December, many holiday hits have an annual spike in popularity during the last few weeks of the year and are retired once the season is over. In December 2011, Billboard began a Holiday Songs chart with 50 positions that monitors the last five weeks of each year to "rank the top holiday hits of all eras using the same methodology as the Hot 100, blending streaming, airplay, and sales data", and in 2013 the number of positions on the chart was doubled, resulting in the Holiday 100. Lee's recording of "Rockin' Around the Christmas Tree" has made appearances on the Holiday 100, which are noted below according to the holiday season in which it charted there.

Collaborations

Guest singles

Videos and DVDs

Music videos

Notes

C^ "Johnny One Time" also peaked at number 50 on the Billboard Hot Country Singles chart.
D^ "I Think I Love You Again" also peaked at number 37 on the Billboard Hot Adult Contemporary Tracks chart. It also peaked at number 84 on the Cash Box pop chart.
E^ "Rockin' Around the Christmas Tree" did not chart upon its initial release, but was released again in both 1959 and then in 1960, when it officially charted on the Billboard Hot 100 singles chart, reaching #14 in 1960. It also peaked at #22 on the Cash Box pop chart. The song has since re-charted on the Billboard Hot 100 several times in the 2010s and 2020s, peaking at #2 in 2019. Billboard
F^ "If This Is Our Last Time" also peaked at #106 on the Cash Box pop chart.
G^ "Nobody Wins" also peaked at #80 on the Cash Box pop chart.

References

Country music discographies
Discographies of American artists
Pop music discographies
Rock music discographies